Vitality is the capacity to live, grow, or develop. More simply it is the property of having life. The perception of vitality is regarded as a basic psychological drive and, in philosophy, a component to the will to live. As such, people seek to maximize their vitality or their experience of vitality—that which corresponds to an enhanced physiological capacity and mental state.

Overview 

The pursuit and maintenance of health and vitality have been at the forefront of medicine and natural philosophy throughout history. Life depends upon various biological processes known as vital processes. As such, vitality is also the characteristic distinction of living from non-living things.
Historically, these vital processes have been viewed as having either mechanistic or non-mechanistic causes. The latter of which is characteristic of vitalism, the doctrine that the phenomena of life cannot be explained by purely chemical and physical mechanisms.

Prior to the 19th century, theoreticians often held that human lifespan had been less limited in the past, and that aging was due to a loss of, and failure to maintain, vitality.
A commonly held view was that people are born with finite vitality, which diminishes over time until illness and debility set in, and finally death.

Religion 

This can be found in the Hindu concept , where vitality in the body derives from a subtle principle in the air and in food, as well as in Hebrew and ancient Greek texts.

Jainism

Vitality and DNA damage

Low vitality or fatigue is a common complaint by older patients during their visits to a physician. Low vitality is increasingly seen as an early indicator of frailty and may reflect an underlying medical illness. Vitality level was measured in 2,487 Copenhagen patients using a standardized, subjective, self-reported vitality scale and was found to be inversely related to DNA damage (as measured in peripheral blood mononuclear cells). DNA damage is indicative of cellular disfunction.

See also 

 Jīvitindriya
 Urban vitality
 Vitalism

References 

Jain philosophical concepts
Natural philosophy
Philosophy of life
Quality of life